Three-phase AC railway electrification was used in Italy, Switzerland and the United States in the early twentieth century. Italy was the major user, from 1901 until 1976, although lines through two tunnels also used the system; the Simplon Tunnel between Switzerland and Italy from 1906 to 1930 (but not connected to the Italian system), and the Cascade Tunnel of the Great Northern Railway in the United States from 1909 to 1939. The first standard gauge line was in Switzerland, from Burgdorf to Thun, from 1899 to 1933.

Advantages
The system provides regenerative braking with the power fed back to the system, so is particularly suitable for mountain railways (provided the grid or another locomotive on the line can accept the power). The locomotives use three-phase induction motors. Lacking brushes and commutators, they require less maintenance. The early Italian and Swiss systems used a low frequency ( Hz), and a relatively low voltage (3,000 or 3,600 volts) compared with later AC systems.

Disadvantages
The overhead wiring, generally having two separate overhead lines and the rail for the third phase, was more complicated, and the low frequency used required a separate generation or conversion and distribution system. Train speed was restricted to one to four speeds, with two or four speeds obtained by pole-changing or cascade operation or both.

Historical systems 
The following is a list of the railways that have used this method of electrification in the past:

 The Cascade Tunnel of the Great Northern Railway.
 The Ferrovia della Valtellina in Italy.
 The Giovi Railway between Genoa and Pontedecimo in Italy.
 The Italian part of the Mont-Cenis line Turin–Modane.
 Many other lines in Northern Italy.
 The Santa Fe - Gergal line in Spain.
The Burgdorf–Thun railway in Switzerland.
 The Simplon Tunnel between Switzerland and Italy.

Current systems
The system is only used today for rack (mountain) railways, where the overhead wiring is less complicated and restrictions on the speeds available less important. Modern motors and their control systems avoid the fixed speeds of traditional systems, as they are built with solid-state converters.

The four current such railways are
 The Corcovado Rack Railway in Rio de Janeiro Brazil.
 The Gornergratbahn in Switzerland. 
 The Jungfraubahn in Switzerland.
 The Petit train de la Rhune in France, still using the original locomotives of 1912

All use standard frequency (50 Hz, or 60 Hz (Brazil)) rather than low frequency, using between 725 and 3,000 volts.

Voltage and frequency
This list shows the voltage and frequency used in various systems, historical and current.

 Various, Siemens Factory Experiments 1892 
 200 V / 25 Hz Panama Canal 1915
 350 V / 40 Hz Lugano Tramway 1895
 460 V / 60 Hz Panama Canal Authority, date unknown
 500 V / ??Hz Ganz Factory Experiment 1896
 550 V / 40 Hz Gornergratbahn, at opening, 1898
 600 V / 60 Hz Taoyuan International Airport Skytrain, at opening, 2003
 600 V / 50 Hz Bukit Panjang LRT line, at opening, 1999
 650 V / 50 Hz Zhujiang New Town APM System, at opening, 2010
 725 V / 50 Hz Gornergratbahn, current 
 750 V / 40 Hz Burgdorf–Thun railway, 1899–1933
 750 V / 40 Hz Hasle-Rüegsau–Langnau railway, 1919–1932
 1,125 V / 50 Hz Jungfrau Railway
 3,000 V / 15 Hz Ferrovia della Valtellina 1902 - 1917
 3,300 V / 16.7 Hz Galleria del Sempione, SBB 1906 - 1930
 3,000 V / 15.8 Hz Valtellina FS 1917 - 1930
 3,600 V / 16.7 Hz Valtellina FS 1930 - 1953
 3,600 V / 16.7 Hz Genoa-Turin, Turin-Frejus-Modane Gallery (F) and other lines in Piedmont and Liguria from 1910 to 1976
 3,600 V / 16.7 Hz Trento-Bolzano-Brennero, Bolzano-Merano FS 1929 - 1965
 3,600 V / 16.7 Hz Genova-La Spezia e Fornovo FS 1926 - 1948
 3,600 V / 16.7 Hz Sondrio-Tirano (Ferrovia Alta Valtellina)
 5,200 V / 25 Hz Gergal-SantaFe FC Sur - Spagna
 6,600 V / 25 Hz Cascade Range, Great Northern Railway (U.S.), 1909 - 1927
 7,000 V / 50 Hz Experiments, Torino-Bussoleno FS 1927 - 1928

Converter systems
This category does not cover railways with a single-phase (or DC) supply which is converted to three-phase on the locomotive or power car, e.g., most railway equipment from the 1990s and earlier using solid-state converters. The Kando system of the 1930s developed by Kálmán Kandó at the Ganz Works, and used in Hungary and Italy, used rotary phase converters on the locomotive to convert the single-phase supply to three phases, as did the Phase-splitting system on the Norfolk and Western Railroad in the United States.

Locomotives 

Usually, the locomotives had one, two, or four motors on the body chassis (not on the bogies), and did not require gearing. The induction motors are designed to run at a particular synchronous speed, and when they run above the synchronous speed downhill, power is fed back to the system. Pole changing and cascade (concatenation) working was used to allow two or four different speeds, and resistances (often liquid rheostats) were required for starting. In Italy freight locomotives used plain cascade with two speeds, ; while express locomotives used cascade combined with pole-changing, giving four speeds, 37, 50, 75 and 100 km/h (23, 31, 46 and 62 mph).  With the use of 3,000 or 3,600 volts at  (16.7) Hz, the supply could be fed directly to the motor without an onboard transformer.

Generally, the motor(s) fed a single axle, with other wheels linked by connecting rods, as the induction motor is sensitive to speed variations and with non-linked motors on several axles the motors on worn wheels would do little or even no work as they would rotate faster. This motor characteristic led to a mishap in the Cascade Tunnel to a GN east-bound freight train with four electric locomotives, two on the head and two pushing. The two pushers suddenly lost power and the train gradually slowed to a stop, but the lead unit engineer was unaware that his train had stopped, and held the controller on the power position until the usual time to transit the tunnel had elapsed. Not seeing daylight, he finally shut down the locomotive, and found that the wheels of his stationary locomotive had ground through two-thirds of the rail web.

Overhead wiring 
Generally two separate overhead wires are used, with the rail for the third phase, though occasionally three overhead wires are used. At junctions, crossovers and crossings the two lines must be kept apart, with a continuous supply to the locomotive, which must have two live conductors wherever it stops. Hence two collectors per overhead phase are used, but the possibility of bridging a dead section and causing a short circuit from the front collector of one phase to the back collector of the other phase must be avoided. The resistance of the rails used for the third phase or return is higher for AC than for DC due to "skin effect", but lower for the low frequency used than for industrial frequency. Losses are also increased, though not in the same proportion, as the impedance is largely reactive.

The locomotive needs to pick up power from two (or three) overhead conductors. Early locomotives on the Italian State Railways used a wide bow collector which covered both wires but later locomotives used a wide pantograph with two collector bars, side by side. A three-phase system is also prone to larger lengthwise gaps between sections, owing to the complexity of two-wire overhead, and so a long pickup base is needed. In Italy this was achieved with the long bow collectors reaching right to the ends of the locomotive, or with a pair of pantographs, also mounted as far apart as possible.

In the United States, a pair of trolley poles were used. The dual conductor pantograph system is used on four mountain railways that continue to use three-phase power (Corcovado Rack Railway in Rio de Janeiro, Brazil, Jungfraubahn and Gornergratbahn in Switzerland and the Petit train de la Rhune in France).

See also
 Three-phase electric power
 :Railway electrification system#Polyphase alternating current systems
 :Category:Three-phase AC locomotives

Footnotes

References

 
 
 
  p. 98
  pp 412–3 & 423-5
  pp 542–3 (para 872) & pp 630–1 (para 919)
 
 
 
  p 347

External links 

History of rail transport
Electric rail transport